The Cara culture flourished in coastal Ecuador, in what is now Manabí Province, in the first millennium CE.

History
In the 10th century CE, they followed the Esmeraldas River up to the high Andean valley now developed as the city San Francisco de Quito.  They defeated the local Quitu tribe and set up a kingdom. The combined Quitu-Cara culture was also known as the Shyris or Scyris civilization, or the Caranqui civilization, which thrived from 800 CE to the 1470s.

For more than four centuries under the kings, called shyris, of the Cara, the Kingdom of Quito dominated much of highlands of modern Ecuador.  The Cara and their allies were narrowly defeated in the epic battles of Tiocajas and Tixán in 1462, by an army of 250,000 led by Túpac Inca, the son of the Emperor of the Inca.  After several decades of consolidation, the Kingdom of Quito became integrated into the Incan Empire.

In 1534 the Quitu-Cara culture were conquered by the Spanish. They became extinct as a tribe chiefly from exposure to new European infectious diseases, which took a heavy toll in fatalities. In addition, the Spanish conquerors married Quitu-Cara women. Their descendants continued to intermarry, producing the mestizo population of the region who gradually became disconnected from their indigenous heritage.

Historians Jacinto Jijón y Caamaño and Alfredo Pareja Diezcanseco contested the existence of such a Kingdom, and suggested that it was a legendary pre-Hispanic account. No archeological evidence of Quitu had been found.

But in the early 21st century, there was a major find of sophisticated tombs, dating to 800 CE, in the Florida neighborhood of Quito. They are 20 meters deep, and each holds the remains of a total of 10 individuals in three levels, accompanied by grave goods of textiles, carved pieces, and food and drink for the afterlife. The Museum of Florida opened in 2010 in the neighborhood to hold artifacts and interpretive material related to Quitu culture, including figures of a man and a woman dressed in traditional Quitu clothing.

Legacy
The Caranqui language is preserved in place names, such as the city of Carán, and the martial term Shyri, still in use in the Ecuadorean Army.

References

History of Ecuador
Andean civilizations
Pre-Columbian cultures